The Ware Mounds and Village Site (11U31), also known as the Running Lake Site, located west of Ware, Illinois, is an archaeological site comprising three platform mounds and a  village site. The site was inhabited by the Late Woodland and Mississippian cultures from c. 800 to c. 1300. The village is one of the only Mississippian villages known to have existed in the Mississippi River valley in Southern Illinois. As the village was located near two major sources of chert, which Mississippian cultures used to make agricultural tools, it was likely a trading center for the mineral.

The graves of indigenous peoples have been found in this mound, which was later used as a cemetery by European settlers. A fourth mound, which was smaller than the other three, was originally located at the site but was demolished by the construction of Illinois Route 3.

The site was added to the National Register of Historic Places on October 18, 1977.

Stone statue

A Mississippian culture stone statue made of fluorite was found buried in Mound 1 by Thomas Perrine in 1873 and nicknamed "Anna". The specimen shows many similarities to other examples found at Angel Mounds near Evansville, Indiana and Obion Mounds near Paris, Tennessee. It is now part of the collection of the Field Museum of Natural History in Chicago, Illinois.

See also
 Kincaid Mounds
 Towosahgy
 Wickliffe Mounds
List of archaeological sites on the National Register of Historic Places in Illinois

References

Archaeological sites on the National Register of Historic Places in Illinois
Geography of Union County, Illinois
Middle Mississippian culture
Mounds in Illinois
National Register of Historic Places in Union County, Illinois